The  Hospital Universitario 12 de Octubre is a public general hospital in the neighborhood of Orcasur, in Madrid, Spain. It is part of the hospital network of the Servicio Madrileño de Salud (SERMAS).

It is one of the healthcare institutions associated to the Complutense University of Madrid (UCM) for the purpose of clinical internship.

History 
The floor plan followed the X-shaped structure characteristic of buildings such as the Memorial Unit's Grace-New Haven Community Hospital or the Wesley Foundation Memorial Unit in Chicago. For the lower floors a sui generis hexagonal-based outline was also employed. Built in 18 months, it was inaugurated by Francisco Franco on 2 October 1973 under the name of Ciudad Sanitaria 1º de octubre ("October 1st Health City"), a nod to his appointment as Head of State on 1 October 1936. Years after the death of the dictator, on 12 October 1988, the name was changed to "12 de Octubre".

As of 2017, it has 1,256 beds.

References 
Citations

Bibliography
 
 

12 de octubre
Usera